This is a list of Australia Test cricketers. A Test match is an international two-innings per side cricket match between two of the leading cricketing nations. The list is arranged in the order in which each player won his Test cap by playing for the Australia cricket team. Where more than one player won his first Test cap in the same Test match, those players are listed alphabetically by surname. The "baggy green" is the name given to the dark green cap with the Australian coat of arms on the front worn by the Australian Test team.

Players
Statistics are correct as of 13 March 2023.

Shirt number history
Since the 2019 Ashes series, there has been an introduction of names and numbers on all Test players' shirts as with ODI/T20 shirts in an effort to engage new fans and help identify the players. This forms part of the inaugural ICC World Test Championship, a league competition between the top nine Test nations spread over a two-year period, culminating in a Final between the top two teams.

^not worn on kit

See also
 Test cricket
 Australia national cricket team
 List of Australia national cricket captains
 List of Australia ODI cricketers
 List of Australia Twenty20 International cricketers

Notes

References

External links
 Cricket Australia
 Howstat

 
Test cricketers
Australian